Rodrigo Eduardo Díaz Alarcón (born March 12, 1984) is a retired Guatemalan swimmer, who specialized in sprint freestyle events. Diaz qualified for the men's 50 m freestyle at the 2004 Summer Olympics in Athens, by achieving a FINA B-standard of 23.60 from the Central American and Mexican Championships in Panama City, Panama. He challenged seven other swimmers in heat four, including two-time Olympian Gregory Arkhurst of Côte d'Ivoire. He raced to third place by 0.11 of a second behind winner José Mafio of Uruguay, outside his entry time of 23.69. Diaz failed to advance into the semifinals, as he placed fifty-third out of 86 swimmers in the preliminaries.

References

1984 births
Living people
Guatemalan male freestyle swimmers
Olympic swimmers of Guatemala
Swimmers at the 2004 Summer Olympics
20th-century Guatemalan people
21st-century Guatemalan people